The Crawling Terror is a BBC Books original novel written by Mike Tucker and based on the long-running British science fiction television series Doctor Who. It features the Twelfth Doctor and Clara Oswald. The book was released on 11 September 2014 along with The Blood Cell and Silhouette.

Audiobook 

An unabridged audiobook version of The Crawling Terror was released on 26 December 2014. It was read by Neve McIntosh who played Madame Vastra in the series.

References

External links 
 
 

2014 British novels
2014 science fiction novels
New Series Adventures
Twelfth Doctor novels
Novels by Mike Tucker
Novels set in England
Fiction set in 1944